Datta High School is a higher secondary school in the city of Netrakona, Bangladesh. It was established in 1889.

History
Datta High School was established as the first secondary school in Netrakona, one of the subdivisions of Mymensingh on 6 February 1889. The District Magistrate and Collector of Mymensingh established the foundation stone of the school, novelist Romesh Chunder Dutt. According to his title, the organization was named 'Datta High School'.  In 1895, Anand Chandra Majumder, a student of this school, was enrolled in the entrance examination under the University of Calcutta in the year 1895 and in five years, Rajendra Kumar Dutt occupied the ninth place in 1900.

In the 1930s, Datta High School made significant contribution in promoting women's education in Netrokona. There were three high schools in the town of Netrokona, but there was no high school for women. Jainesh Ranjan Roy, the chief rector of Datta High School, started in 1933 a separate section of the seventh grade with only eight female students. In 1937, eight people passed the entrance examinations. Datta High School creates another history by celebrating birth of Rabindranath Tagore outside Santiniketan in Bangladesh. In 1930, the principal entrepreneur of Rabindra Jain festival was Shailajarjan Majumder, Principal of Santiniketan Music Bhaban. One time Datta High School was the center of student movement in Netrokona and the center of culture.

Datta High School students have played an important role in language movement, 'Six point movement of 66', mass upsurge of '69, Liberation War of 1971 'and anti-autocratic movement of '90.

Location
The school is located in Mukterpara, in front of Netrakona Govt. Girls High School and beside of Netrakona Shaheed Minar.

Academics
Datta High School is the oldest high school in Netrakona. The school is divided into three sections. These are the kindergarten section, the boy's section and girls section. In kindergarten section, they teach students from play to class five, both boys and girls. For secondary students, there are two shifts for boys and girls where they study from class six to SSC. The school operates a double shift, with girls attending in the morning (7:30 AM to 12:30 noon) and boys in the afternoon (12:00 noon to 5:30 PM). About 50 teachers are working for these three sections and the number of students is about 2500 which is the biggest number in Netrokona District.

References

Schools in Netrokona District